The 1982 McDonald's All-American Boys Game was an All-star basketball game played on Saturday, April 10, 1982 at the Rosemont Horizon in Rosemont, Illinois. The game's rosters featured the best and most highly recruited high school boys graduating in 1982. The game was the 5th annual version of the McDonald's All-American Game first played in 1978.

1982 game
The game was not televised, but highlights were aired by CBS Sports. The East team could count on several guards and forwards, including heavily recruited Billy Thompson, considered one of the top players of the class. The West team had local favorites Efrem Winters and Bruce Douglas, both committed to Illinois, and had 5 guards and 6 centers on their roster: the only forward was Kerry Trotter. The West won 103–84 and Winters had a solid performance both on offense and on defense, and scored 19 points on 9/15 shooting, earning the MVP award. Dell Curry led the East with 20 points, while Thompson added 15; for the West, Kenny Walker was the top scorer with 20, and Trotter scored 14. The game attendance of 15,836 set a then all-time record not only for the McDonald's game, but also for high school basketball in the state of Illinois. Of the 25 players, 13 went on to play at least 1 game in the NBA.

East roster

West roster

Coaches
The East team was coached by:
 Head Coach Joe Gallagher of St. John's College High School (Washington, D.C.)

The West team was coached by:
 Head Coach Ed Pepple of Mercer Island High School (Mercer Island, Washington)

References

External links
McDonald's All-American on the web
McDonald's All-American all-time rosters
McDonald's All-American rosters at Basketball-Reference.com
Game stats at Realgm.com

1981–82 in American basketball
1982
1982 in sports in Illinois
Basketball in Illinois